Cheadle Town Football Club are a football club based in Cheadle, Greater Manchester. They were established in 1961 and joined the North West Counties Football League in 1983. Their home ground is Park Road Stadium.

History

As Grasmere Rovers
Cheadle Town's history can be traced back to 1961 when a 14-year-old boy called Barrie Dean asked his neighbour, Chris Davies, to help his friends form a football team. This team was called Grasmere Rovers after the name of the street that both Dean and Davies lived on (Grasmere Avenue). Chris Davies took on the role of team manager and on 3 September 1961, Grasmere Rovers took to the field for the first time, losing 0–5 to Sutton Boys.

Grasmere started out in the Manchester Junior Football League – a league they would eventually win in the 1967–68 season – playing their games on a Sunday afternoon at The Mellands Playing Fields in Belle Vue. They joined the Manchester League in 1972, allowing them to play their football on the more regular Saturday afternoon. Now under the managerial guidance of Albert Pike, with Chris Davies as chairman and now playing their matches at Surrey Street in Glossop, Grasmere Rovers went from strength-to-strength; the peak of which was the 1979–80 season where they won the Manchester League, the Gilchrist Cup, the Manchester County Amateur Cup and the Derbyshire Junior Cup. In that same season striker Peter Tilley ran in 43 goals.

The team moved to their present-day home of Park Road for the 1982–83 season. Al Sadd were the first ever visitors on Saturday 12 August 1982, running out 4–1 winners on the day. This would be the last season that the team would be known as Grasmere Rovers.

As Cheadle Town
The club joined the North West Counties Football League for the 1983–84 season as Cheadle Town, under the managerial guidance of Gerry Clewes. They finished their first season a lowly 15th in Division Three but were promoted "by default" at the end of the 1986–87 season when Division Three was incorporated into Division Two.

Cheadle Town have spent most of their NWCFL life in Division Two; 1998 saw the start of a three-year escape from Division Two as the club were promoted to Division One. The club struggled with lowly finishes during their three seasons and were ultimately relegated back to Division Two in 2001 after finishing bottom. They have stayed at this level ever since; the fact that Cheadle Town found themselves in Division One for the start of the 2008–09 season was merely down to a renaming of the NWCFL leagues.

Club colours and badge
Cheadle Town's most common colours were white and black worn in the combination of white shirts, black shorts and black stockings. They have also appeared in a multitude of other colour combinations such as yellow and blue, sky blue and white stripes and also all-red.

As part of the club's 50th anniversary celebrations in 2011 the club decided to revert to the original colours of Grasmere Rovers: green and white.

For the start of the 2018–19 season the club changed its colours once again to red-and-white striped shirts, red shorts and stockings.

The club logo was also changed for the start of the 2018–19 season.

The old badge was taken directly from the coat of arms granted to the Cheadle & Gatley Urban District Council back in December 1955.

Stadium
Park Road Stadium has an official capacity of 2,000; its record attendance is 1,700 for a friendly match against Stockport County in August 1994. During the 1966 World Cup it was used by the Portugal national team as a training ground and has also had the honour of hosting a soccer school run by Brazilian legend Jairzinho during the summer of 1993.

It has a covered main stand on the west side of the pitch that can seat approximately 250 and contains the changing rooms underneath; the other three sides of the pitch are uncovered and surrounded by nothing more than a railing. Other facilities at the stadium include a clubhouse and a portable building that doubles up as the refreshments kiosk and hospitality room.

In April 2014 the club announced that they had been awarded a £5,000 grant from Capital One as part of the company's Grounds For Improvement competition. This money was used for two new dugouts, a brand-new hard-standing surface directly from the tunnel to the dugout areas and new storage facilities. In the recent months the club has managed to install seats in its main stand and has begun rebuilding its club house after the old structure was demolished in November 2014. A new F.A standard 5 a-side pitch has also been built.

Further work on the stadium took place over the summer of 2018 thanks to the club winning a £50,000 Buildbase bursary. The clubhouse and changing rooms were refurbished and a new external cafe was opened.

Playing squad
As of 18 October 2021:

Players who went on to play for Football League teams
(club in brackets is the one joined by player after leaving Cheadle Town)
Ashley Ward (Crewe Alexandra)
Dean Crowe (Stoke City)
Colin Little (Crewe Alexandra)

Management Team

Current Management Team

Honours

As Grasmere Rovers
Manchester & District Cup
Winners 1972–73
Manchester League Division One
Winners 1979–80
Runners-up 1980–81, 1981–82
Manchester County Amateur Cup
Winners 1979–80
Gilchrist Cup
Winners 1979–80
Derbyshire Junior Cup
Winners 1979–80

As Cheadle Town
Lamot Pils Trophy
Runners-up 1990–91
North West Counties Division One Trophy
Runners-up 1995–96, 2009–10
Stockport DFA Cup (the club uses the Reserves squad to compete in this tournament)
Runners-Up 2009–10
Winners 2012–13, 2016–17

League performances

Foreign tours
Cheadle Town are famous throughout non-league football for their foreign tours. When abroad the club travels under the name of AFC Manchester and have clocked up over 200,000 airmiles, 96 games in 30 different countries, a total aggregate crowd of 312,000 and 111 goals. Opponents have included seven national teams with the club being the first and only English outfit to play in and against Cuba (in 1975) – a match that was shown on Cuban national television. They have even graced the Azteca Stadium in Mexico City, playing to a crowd of 65,000 and met people such as Alfredo Di Stéfano, Ronnie Biggs and Rajiv Gandhi.

In October 2014 the club played host to the Russian under-19 team as a warm-up for the Russians prior to their game against Northern Ireland.  Cheadle lost 0–22.

Link with FC Sports
In December 2017, Cheadle Town F.C. became part of the Little Sports Group. The Little Sports Group founded FC Sports in 2009, consisting of junior football teams from u4's to u16's. In 2013 FC Sports was awarded 'Charter Standard' status by The FA, this kitemark recognises the standards of things such as facilities, coaching, policies and procedures and much more.

References

RSSSF Football Statistics
Cheadle Town at the Football Club History Database
Tony Kempster's English Football Site

External links
Official Site
The North West Counties Football League

Football clubs in England
North West Counties Football League clubs
Football clubs in the Metropolitan Borough of Stockport
Association football clubs established in 1961
1961 establishments in England
Cheadle, Greater Manchester